Lanzhou or Lan Prefecture (嵐州) was a zhou (prefecture) in imperial China seated in modern Lan County in Shanxi, China. It existed (intermittently) from 623 to 1369.

Geography
The administrative region of Lanzhou in the Tang dynasty is in Shanxi. It probably includes parts of modern: 
Under the administration of Lüliang:
Lan County
Xing County
Under the administration of Xinzhou:
Jingle County
Kelan County

References
 

Prefectures of the Tang dynasty
Prefectures of the Song dynasty
Prefectures of Later Jin (Five Dynasties)
Prefectures of Later Han (Five Dynasties)
Prefectures of Northern Han
Prefectures of Later Tang
Former prefectures in Shanxi
Prefectures of the Yuan dynasty
Prefectures of the Jin dynasty (1115–1234)